Leningrad Cowboys Go Wild is a 2000 compilation album by the Leningrad Cowboys released in Germany.

Track listing

References

2000 compilation albums
Leningrad Cowboys albums